|}

The Barberstown Castle Novice Chase is a Grade 1 National Hunt Steeplechase in Ireland which is open to horses aged five years or older. It is run at Punchestown over a distance of about 2 miles (3,219 metres), and during its running there are eleven fences to be jumped. The race is for novice chasers, and it is scheduled to take place each year during the Punchestown Festival in late April or early May.

During the 1990s the event was sponsored by the Bank of Ireland and Tripleprint. It was promoted to Grade 1 status in 1998, and its sponsorship was taken over by Swordlestown Stud in 2000. Ryanair sponsored the race from 2010 to 2021 and the present sponsor, Barberstown Castle, began supporting the race in 2022.

The field usually includes horses which ran previously in the Arkle Challenge Trophy at Cheltenham, and the last to win both races was Footpad in 2018.

Records
Leading jockey since 1992 (4 wins):
 Barry Geraghty – Moscow Flyer (2002), Big Zeb (2008), Lucky William (2012), God's Own (2014)
 Ruby Walsh - Le Roi Miguel (2003), Arvika Ligeonniere (2013), Un De Sceaux (2015), Douvan (2016)

Leading trainer since 1992 (9 wins):
 Willie Mullins - Barker (2009), Arvika Ligeonniere (2013), Un de Sceaux (2015), Douvan (2016), Great Field (2017), Footpad (2018), Chacun Pour Soi (2019), Energumene (2021), Blue Lord (2022)

Winners since 1992

See also
 Horse racing in Ireland
 List of Irish National Hunt races

References
 Racing Post:

 pedigreequery.com – Swordlestown Cup Novice Chase – Punchestown.
 racenewsonline.co.uk – Racenews Archive (April 25, 2003).

National Hunt races in Ireland
National Hunt chases
Punchestown Racecourse